The Man Who Would Be King is a 1975 adventure film adapted from the 1888 Rudyard Kipling novella of the same name. It was adapted and directed by John Huston and starred Sean Connery, Michael Caine, Saeed Jaffrey and Christopher Plummer as Kipling (giving a name to the novella's anonymous narrator). The film follows two rogue ex-soldiers, former non-commissioned officers in the British Army, who set off from late 19th century British India in search of adventure and end up in faraway Kafiristan, where one is taken for a god and made their king.

Plot
In 1885 in India, while working late at night in his newspaper office, the journalist Rudyard Kipling is approached by a ragged, seemingly crazed derelict who reveals himself to be Peachy Carnehan, an old acquaintance. Carnehan tells Kipling the story of how he and his comrade-in-arms Danny Dravot, ex-sergeants of the British Army who had become adventurers, travelled far beyond India into the remote land of Kafiristan.

Three years earlier, Dravot and Carnehan had met Kipling under less than auspicious circumstances. After stealing Kipling's pocket-watch, Carnehan found a masonic tag on the chain, and realising he had robbed a fellow Freemason, felt he had to return it. At the time, he and Dravot were working on a plot to blackmail a local raja, which Kipling foiled by getting the British district commissioner to intervene. In a comic relief turn, Carnehan obliquely blackmails the commissioner in order to avoid deportation.

Frustrated at the lack of opportunities for lucrative criminal mischief, in an India becoming more civilised and regulated—partly through their own hard efforts as soldiers—and with little to look forward to in the United Kingdom except dreary, poorly paid jobs, the two turn up at Kipling's office with an audacious plan. Forsaking India, they will head with twenty rifles and ammunition to Kafiristan, a country virtually unknown to Europeans since its conquest by Alexander the Great. There they will offer their services to a ruler and then help him to conquer his neighbours, but proceed to overthrow him and loot the country. Kipling, after first trying to dissuade them, gives Dravot his masonic tag as a token of brotherhood.

After signing a contract pledging mutual loyalty and forswearing women and drink, the two set off on an epic overland journey north beyond the Khyber Pass. Over the next few weeks, they travel through Afghanistan, fighting off bandits, blizzards and avalanches, as they make their way into the unknown land of Kafiristan. They chance upon a Gurkha soldier, Billy Fish, the sole survivor of a years past, British expedition. Speaking English as well as the local language, Billy smooths their way as they begin their rise, first offering their services to the chief of a much-raided village. When a force has been trained in modern weapons and tactics, they lead it out against some hated neighbours. During the battle, an arrow pierces Dravot's jacket but he is unharmed.

Both sides take him to be a god, though in fact the arrowhead was stopped by his leather bandolier. Victory follows victory, with the defeated adding to the ranks of the swelling army. With their enemies vanquished, nobody is left to stand in their way, as they are summoned to the holy city of Sikandergul by the high priest of the region. He sets up a re-enactment of the arrow incident, to determine whether Dravot is a man or a god by seeing whether or not he bleeds. When his shirt is torn open, they are amazed to see the masonic tag around his neck. It contains the sacred symbol left by Sikander, their name for Alexander the Great, who had promised to send a son to rule over them.

Hailing Dravot as king as well as god, they show him the royal treasury, which is full of unimaginable amounts of gold and jewels that are now all his. Carnehan suggests that they leave with as much loot as they can carry as soon as the snows have melted on the mountain passes. Dravot, however, is beginning to enjoy the adulation of the locals, settling their disputes and issuing laws, and even dreams of visiting Queen Victoria as an equal. He is also struck by the beauty of a girl called Roxane, the name of Alexander's wife, and cancels their pact to avoid women, saying he will marry her in order to leave the people an heir. When she is reluctantly brought to him, he tries to kiss her, but she, terrified that the touch of a god means death to a mortal, bites his cheek. Seeing him bleed, the people realise he is only human and try to grab the British impostors.

Outnumbered in the ensuing battle, Dravot is captured and is made to walk onto a rope bridge, where he lustily sings the hymn "The Son of God Goes Forth to War". When the ropes are cut, he falls thousands of feet to his death. Carnehan is crucified between two pine trees, but upon being found still alive the next morning, is freed. Crippled in body and unhinged in mind from his ordeal, he eventually makes his way back to India as a beggar. Finishing his story, he leaves Kipling's office after putting a bundle on the desk. When Kipling opens it, he finds Dravot's skull, still wearing a golden crown.

Cast

 Sean Connery as Daniel Dravot
 Michael Caine as Peachy Carnehan
 Christopher Plummer as Rudyard Kipling
 Saeed Jaffrey as Billy Fish
 Shakira Caine as Roxanne
 Doghmi Larbi as Ootah
 Jack May as District Commissioner
 Karroom Ben Bouih as Kafu Selim
 Mohammad Shamsi as Babu
 Albert Moses as Ghulam
 Paul Antrim as Mulvaney
 Graham Acres as Officer
 PJ Retiree as Chief
 The Blue Dancers of Goulamine as Dancers

Production
The Man Who Would Be King had been a pet project of John Huston's for decades after he had read the book as a child. Huston had planned to make the film since the 1950s, originally with Clark Gable and Humphrey Bogart in the roles of Daniel and Peachy. He was unable to get the project off the ground before Bogart died in 1957; Gable followed in 1960. Burt Lancaster and Kirk Douglas were then approached to play the leads, followed by Richard Burton and Peter O'Toole. In the 1970s, Huston approached Robert Redford and Paul Newman for the roles. Newman advised Huston that British actors should play the roles, and it was he who recommended Connery and Caine. Caine was very keen to appear, especially after he was told that his part had originally been written for Humphrey Bogart, his favourite actor as a young man.

The role of Roxanne (the only listed female character in the movie) was originally slated for Tessa Dahl, the daughter of Roald Dahl and actress Patricia Neal. Dahl, excited to take the role, had prepared for the part by losing weight and capping her teeth. However, at the last minute, director Huston had decided to cast someone whose appearance was more in keeping with natives of Kafiristan. "We've got to find an Arab princess somewhere", he is recounted as saying over dinner with Caine. At that same dinner, Caine's Indian-descended wife Shakira was present, so Huston and Caine persuaded her to take on the role.

The film was shot at Pinewood Studios and at locations in France and Morocco.

While on location, Caine strongly objected to an assistant director's racist treatment of Saeed Jaffrey, who played the Gurkha guide Billy Fish.

The stuntman Joe Powell doubled for Sean Connery and it was he who performed the fall from the rope bridge at the film's climax. Execution involved a potentially fatal fall of 80 feet onto a pile of cardboard boxes and mattresses. Huston was so impressed with Powell's performance he said, "That's the darndest stunt I've ever seen!" Caine said that Connery did not like heights and was not fond of the final scene in which he had to walk to the middle of the bridge. Caine recalled, "There was a day when we were shooting on the rope bridge and Sean turned to John and said "Do you think the bridge looks safe?" John lowered his eyes and said, "Sean, the bridge looks the way it always has. The only difference is that today, you're going to be standing in the middle of it."

Music
Maurice Jarre scored the film and invited classical Indian musicians to participate in the recording sessions with a traditional European symphony orchestra. A key song, which figures within the plot of the movie, is a fusion of the music of the Irish song "The Minstrel Boy" with the lyrics of Reginald Heber's "The Son of God Goes Forth to War". This song is heard at key moments in the score, notably being sung by Dravot as he is being executed and as he tumbles to his death. The film's performance of "The Minstrel Boy" is by William Lang, late of the Black Dyke Band and the London Symphony Orchestra.

Release
The film premiered on 26 November 1975 at the Tehran Film Festival. It had a Royal premiere attended by Princess Anne at the Odeon Leicester Square in London on 18 December 1975 before opening to the public on the following day.

Home media
The Man Who Would Be King was released by Warner Home Video on DVD in Region 1 on 19 November 1997, and was re-issued on 9 November 2010, followed by a Region A Blu-ray release on 7 June 2011. In Region 2, the film was released on DVD by Sony Pictures Home Entertainment on 27 August 2007, with a re-issue on 17 May 2010.

Reception

Critical reaction
John Simon of New York magazine considered the film to be Huston's best work since The African Queen, twenty-three years earlier. Jay Cocks of Time magazine wrote, "John Huston has been wanting to make this movie for more than twenty years. It was worth the wait. A mellow, brassy, vigorous movie, rich in adventure and melancholy, The Man Who Would Be King represents the best work Huston has done in a decade. Like The Treasure of the Sierra Madre (1947), The Man Who Would Be King is also a meditation on the excesses of ambition and avarice." Vincent Canby of The New York Times felt the film "manages to be great fun in itself while being most faithful to Kipling, whose story, written in the 1890's, is a kind of raffish metaphor for the British colonial experience that did not end for another half century."

Roger Ebert of the Chicago Sun-Times gave the film four complete stars, writing the film is a "swashbuckling adventure, pure and simple, and in the hands of a master. It's been a long time since there's been an escapist entertainment quite this unabashed and thrilling and fun ...We get strong characterizations, we get excitement and, best of all, we get to laugh every once in a while." Gene Siskel of the Chicago Tribune, who also gave the film four complete stars, praised the film as "a genuinely witty and literate adventure story ...that should appeal to the whole family. Kids over the age of 10 will enjoy being transported into another world of casbahs and camels; adults will be hooked by the witty dialog, much of it taken from its source, a Rudyard Kipling story." A review in Variety was critical of the film mostly because of Caine's performance, stating "Whether it was the intention of the director-adapter John Huston or not, the tale of action and adventure became a too-broad comedy, mostly due to the poor performance of Michael Caine".

Another review aggregator, Metacritic, calculated a score of 91 based on 15 reviews, indicating "universal acclaim". In 2019, in a ranking of Caine's filmography, Andrew Pulver of The Guardian selected the film as Caine's best-ever role. Both Connery and Caine have considered the movie their favorite of all they had worked on.

Accolades

References

Bibliography

External links

 
 
 
 
 
 

1975 films
1970s adventure drama films
American adventure drama films
British adventure drama films
1970s English-language films
Films about Freemasonry
Films about friendship
Films based on short fiction
Films based on works by Rudyard Kipling
Films directed by John Huston
Films set in Afghanistan
Films set in deserts
Films set in the 1880s
Films set in the British Raj
Murder in films
Films with screenplays by John Huston
Films scored by Maurice Jarre
Films produced by John Foreman (producer)
Films shot in Morocco
1975 drama films
1970s American films
1970s British films